"Back to You" is a song by Canadian singer Bryan Adams, written by Adams and Eliot Kennedy. It was released in December 1997 as a live acoustic version for Adams' album MTV Unplugged and features students from the Juilliard School, conducted by Michael Kamen. Upon its release, the song became Adams' ninth number-one single in his home country, staying at number one on the RPM Top Singles chart for three nonconsecutive weeks, and reached the top 40 in Australia, Hungary, Iceland, and the United Kingdom. It was later included on his compilation albums The Best of Me and Anthology.

The B-sides are two tracks performed the same night as the album; however, "Can't Stop This Thing We Started / It Ain't a Party...If You Can't Come 'Round" is only featured on the MTV Unplugged DVD while "Hey Elvis" was previously unreleased.

Critical reception
Larry Flick from Billboard wrote, "Here is the bouncy, uptempo pop single that Adams' longtime fans have been longing for. A new tune that will be featured on the singer's forthcoming "Unplugged" collection, "Back To You" has a sweet acoustic feel and deserves to easily glide onto top 40 playlists. The chorus has instant sing-along potential, and Adams delivers every syllable with an "aw-shucks" romantic flair. At the same time, there's enough bite in the instrumentation to keep mainstream rock radio listeners happily engaged. An excellent single that leaves you hankering for more."

Track listing

Personnel
 Bryan Adams – guitar, vocals
 Keith Scott – lead guitar, vocal harmonies
 Dave Taylor – bass, vocal harmonies
 Micky Curry – drums, vocal harmonies
 Danny Cummings – percussion, vocal harmonies
 Tommy Mandel – piano
 Michael Kamen – string arrangement and conductor

Charts

Weekly charts

Year-end charts

Release history

References

Bryan Adams songs
1997 singles
1997 songs
A&M Records singles
RPM Top Singles number-one singles
Songs written by Bryan Adams
Songs written by Eliot Kennedy